In enzymology, a 3-mercaptopyruvate sulfurtransferase is an enzyme that catalyzes the chemical reactions of 3-mercaptopyruvate. This enzyme belongs to the family of transferases, specifically the sulfurtransferases.  This enzyme participates in cysteine metabolism. It is encoded by the MPST gene.

The enzyme is of interest because it provides a pathway for detoxification of cyanide, especially since it occurs widely in the cytosol and distributed broadly.

Nomenclature 
The systematic name of this enzyme class is 3-mercaptopyruvate:cyanide sulfurtransferase. This enzyme is also called beta-mercaptopyruvate sulfurtransferase and in the older literature, human liver rhodanese.

Structure

Gene 

The MPST gene lies on the chromosome location of 22q12.3 and consists of 6 exons.  Alternatively spliced transcript variants encoding the same protein have been identified.

Protein 

The encoded cytoplasmic protein is a member of the rhodanese family but is not rhodanese itself, which is found only in mitochondria. MPST protein consists of 317 amino acid residues and weighs 35250Da. MPST contains two rhodanese domains with similar secondary structures suggesting a common evolutionary origin. The catalytic cysteine residue only exists in the C-terminal rhodanese domain. The protein can function as a monomer or as a disulfide-linked homodimer.

Function and mechanism
The biological function of MPST remains unclear. It may be involved in cyanide detoxification, biosynthesis of thiosulfate, production of the signalling molecule hydrogen sulfide, or the degradation of cysteine.

MPST reacts with 3-MP to convert a cysteinyl residue to the persulfide-containing intermediate:
RSH  +  HSCH2C(O)CO2−   →   RSSH  +  CH3C(O)CO2−
The persulfide group is labile, and can transfer S to other groups, such as cyanide.  It is also susceptible to reduction to release hydrogen sulfide.

H2S is produced from l-cysteine by cystathionine-γ-lyase (CSE) and MPST. l-cysteine-dependent production of H2S by MPST is a two-step reaction. In the first step, cysteine transaminase converts l-cysteine along with α-ketoglutarate into 3-mercaptopyruvate (3-MP). Subsequently, MPST converts 3-MP into H2S. MPST catalyzes the transfer of a sulfur atom from mercaptopyruvate to sulfur acceptors like cyanides or thiol compounds. Thus it is also considered to participate in cysteine degradation. MPST generates H2S in coronary artery, mediating its effects through direct modulation of NO, namely vasodilation. This has important implications for H2S-based therapy in healthy and diseased coronary arteries.

Biological significance 
MPST is expressed in a number of tissues, including kidney, liver, lung, heart, muscle, spleen, and brain.

3-Mercaptopyruvate (3-MP), along with α-ketoglutarate, is derived from cysteine by the action of an aminotransferase. Thus MPST may participate in cysteine degradation.

Biomedical

Hydrogen sulfide production
H2S is produced from MPST (as well as by cystathionine-γ-lyase).  MPST generates H2S in coronary artery, mediating its effects through direct modulation of NO, namely vasodilation. This has important implications for H2S-based therapy in healthy and diseased coronary arteries.

Mercaptolactate-cysteine disulfiduria
Deficiency in MPST has been found related to mercaptolactate-cysteine disulfiduria, a rare inheritable disorder associated with oversecretion of mercaptolactate-cysteine disulfide in urine. Immunoreactivity for MPST was detected in malignant uroepithelium and muscular layer of bladder cancer samples. Protein levels and catalytic activities of MPST increased with the increase of malignant degrees in human bladder tissues and human urothelial cell carcinoma of bladder (UCB) cell lines and this may promote the application of MPST novel enzymes to UCB diagnosis or treatment.

References

Further reading (mainly older literature)

 
 
 
 
 

EC 2.8.1
Enzymes of known structure